Terinos atlita is a butterfly in the family Nymphalidae. It was described by Johann Christian Fabricius in 1787. It is found in the Indomalayan realm.

Subspecies
T. a. atlita (Sumatra)
T. a. teuthras Hewitson, 1862 (Peninsular Malaysia, Langkawi)
T. a. militum Oberthür, 1877 (Thailand - Indochina)
T. a. falcata Fruhstorfer, 1898 (Siam)
T. a. fulminans Butler, 1869 (Borneo)
T. a. guangxienis Chou, 1994 (Guangxi)

References

External links
Terinos at Markku Savela's Lepidoptera and Some Other Life Forms

Terinos
Butterflies described in 1787